Chloé Sarah Hayden (born July 23, 1997), is an Australian actress, social media personality, disability rights activist and author. She is known for her role as Quinni Gallagher-Jones on the 2022 Netflix reboot of Heartbreak High and her online disability awareness and activism.

Early life
Chloe Sarah Hayden was on born on 23 July 1997, in Melbourne, Australia. Hayden grew up near the city of Geelong, Victoria. Hayden has a younger brother who is also autistic, as well as an adopted brother and sister from Taiwan.

At the age of 13, she had attended ten different schools and suffered from severe depression and anxiety as a result of severe bullying, leading Hayden to be homeschooled as a result of this bullying.

Hayden was diagnosed with autism at age 13, and ADHD at age 22.

Career
Hayden began posting to her YouTube channel in 2016, under the pseudonym Princess Aspien. In 2020, she went viral after she posted a YouTube video criticizing Australian singer Sia's debut film Music, for its portrayal of autism.

In November 2021, she was cast as Quinn “Quinni” Gallagher-Jones in the Netflix reboot of Heartbreak High. Her character, Quinni, is autistic and was written with her input; This makes Hayden one of the first autistic actors to portray an autistic main character. Hayden herself says that she loves playing an autistic character as she can freely stim.

In August 2022, Hayden release Different, Not Less, a part self-help guide book that talks about seeking diagnosis, sensory issues and much more. Hayden stated, “I wrote this book because I wish I had it when I was diagnosed."

Hayden also appeared in the Australia Marie Claire magazine for the Women of the Year edition.

Public image and activism
Hayden's performance as Quinni in Heartbreak High was universally well-received with many commending it that it actually is a well represented autistic character that isn't for once stereotyped.

Hayden couldn't understand why she wasn't able to have friends as they never liked her. Hayden wishes to break existing autism stereotypes by talking about her experiences. She has stated, "I see autism as a superpower, if you look at people at the top of their fields, so many of them are on the spectrum.”

She is a proponent of autism rights and neurodiversity movements.

In 2023, Hayden accused Marvel Stadium of ableism after they were barred from a sensory room during a concert for Harry Styles in February 2023. Marvel Stadium then stated that they would be building a second sensory room and retraining their staff.

Personal life
Hayden has been in a relationship with Dylan Rohan since 2020. They got engaged in December 2022.

She is vegan and cannot eat red food which is one of her sensory issues from being autistic.

Awards and nominations

Filmography

Writing

References

External links 
 

1997 births
21st-century Australian actresses
Actors with autism
People with attention deficit hyperactivity disorder
Living people
Actresses from Melbourne
Australian people of Irish descent
Australian disability rights activists
Australian Internet celebrities